Hacıtəpə (also, Gadzhytepe and Gadzhitepe) is a village and municipality in the Masally Rayon of Azerbaijan.  It has a population of 1,277.

Notes

References 

Populated places in Masally District